Bartosz Papka (born 12 September 1993) is a Polish footballer who plays as an attacking midfielder for Stomil Olsztyn on loan from Korona Kielce in the Ekstraklasa.

References

1993 births
Living people
People from Jędrzejów County
Polish footballers
Association football midfielders
Ekstraklasa players
Korona Kielce players
OKS Stomil Olsztyn players
Sportspeople from Świętokrzyskie Voivodeship